The Citadel Bulldogs basketball teams represented The Citadel, The Military College of South Carolina in Charleston, South Carolina, United States.  The program was established in 1900–01, and has continuously fielded a team since 1912–13.  Their primary rivals are College of Charleston, Furman and VMI.

1969–70

|-
|colspan=7 align=center|1970 Southern Conference men's basketball tournament

1970–71

|-
|colspan=7 align=center|1971 Southern Conference men's basketball tournament

1971–72

|-
|colspan=7 align=center|1972 Southern Conference men's basketball tournament

1972–73

|-
|colspan=7 align=center|1973 Southern Conference men's basketball tournament

1973–74

|-
|colspan=7 align=center|1974 Southern Conference men's basketball tournament

References
 

The Citadel Bulldogs basketball seasons